In the lead-up to the 2022 Australian federal election, a number of polling companies conducted regular opinion polls for various news organisations. These polls collected data on parties' primary vote, and contained an estimation of the two-party-preferred vote. They also asked questions about the electorates' views on major party leaders. Key polling companies are YouGov, Essential Media Communications, Roy Morgan Research, and Resolve Strategic.

Ipsos polls used to be published in The Sydney Morning Herald, The Age and the Australian Financial Review; however following the shock result of the 2019 Australian federal election, when the Coalition won the election against all of the opinion polls' predictions, the Nine Entertainment group decided to discontinue its relationship with that company. The newspapers did not report any Ipsos political polling until 4 Apr 2022, but continued to report the results of other Ipsos polls.

Graphical summary
Aggregate data of voting intention from all opinion polling since the last federal election. Local regression trends for each party, weighted by sample size, are shown as solid lines.

Two party preferred

Primary vote

Voting intention

Assessment of polling accuracy
Following the ‘polling failure’ of the 2019 Australian federal election, where all the major polling organisations’ final polls erroneously predicted a Labor victory, a great deal of attention was paid to changes in methodology and the accuracy of the polls at the 2022 election.  

Post-election, several well-known psephologists undertook assessments of accuracy for the voting results produced by each major pollster’s final poll.  These employed differing methods of assessment, but generally determined that the polling industry was more accurate overall than in 2019, though still tended to overstate Labor’s primary vote share.  

William Bowe (The Poll Bludger) summed this up by saying, “The 2022 federal election was a much happier experience for the polling industry than 2019, with each of five pollster producing election eve primary vote numbers broadly suggestive of the actual result.  However, there was a collective error in favour of Labor, whose actual primary vote came in 2.3% below the pollster consensus while the Coalition landed 0.4% higher”.

Psephologists Dr. Adrian Beaumont of The Conversation found Resolve Strategic’s final poll for the Nine newspapers to be the most accurate.

Dr. Kevin Bonham’s polling blog said YouGov (which conducts Newspoll) was the best poll in three of the five categories, and "made the most useful contributions to forecasting the result". Solely based on the final poll, he shared the honours between Resolve Strategic and Newspoll on the basis that the former performed better on three of the four measures in his analysis, but the latter performed better on the measure he considered to be more important.

2022

2019–2021

Polling for individual seats

Preferred prime minister

Sub-national polling 
Some pollsters provided breakdowns of their polls by state, whilst others only poll a specific state. These results are listed by state below.

New South Wales

Victoria

Queensland

Western Australia

South Australia

Tasmania

Government approval rating

Individual polls

National direction polling

Individual polls

See also 

Opinion polling for the 2019 Australian federal election

Notes

References

2022
2022 Australian federal election